Wheel of Chance is a lost 1928 silent film feature directed by Alfred Santell and starring Richard Barthelmess. It was produced and distributed by First National Pictures.

Cast
Richard Barthelmess as Nilolai Turkeltaub/Jacob Taline
Bodil Rosing as Sara Turkeltaub
Warner Oland as Mosher Turkeltaub
Anne Schaefer as Hanscha Talinef
Lina Basquette as Ada Berkowitz
Margaret Livingston as Josie Drew
Sidney Franklin as Pa Berkowitz
Martha Franklin as Ma Berkowitz
Lon Poff as (*uncredited)

Preservation status
The film is lost.

References

External links

 double-exposure portrait of Richard Barthelmess playing two roles(archived)

1928 films
American silent feature films
Lost American films
American black-and-white films
First National Pictures films
Films with screenplays by Gerald Duffy
Films directed by Alfred Santell
1928 lost films
1920s American films